Ducommun is an aerospace and defense company based in California.

Ducommun may also refer to:

 Élie Ducommun (1833–1906), Swiss peace activist
 Rick Ducommun (1952–2015), Canadian actor
 Samuel Ducommun (1914-1987), Swiss composer